Shuozhou Huairen Airport or Huairen Air Base, located in Huairen, Shuozhou, is a People's Liberation Army Air Force (PLA-AF) installation near the Fen River,  south of the city of Datong, in northern Shanxi province, China. It is located in the PLA Beijing Military Region.  It formerly served as the main public airport for Datong until replaced by the newly built Datong Yungang Airport in 2006.

It is the headquarters of the PLA-AF 15th Fighter Division which operates Chengdu J-7 fighters and Nanchang Q-5 ground attack aircraft.

Satellite imagery of the site shows a single 10,500 foot runway oriented NE/SW and a full-length parallel taxiway connected to revetments at either end of the field.

See also
List of airports in China
List of People's Liberation Army Air Force airbases

References

External links
 PLAAF Order of Battle at Scramble Magazine - Dutch Aviation Society

Airports in Shanxi
Chinese Air Force bases
Defunct airports in China